Douglas Arthur Gerhart (born November 23, 1936) is a former American football coach and player. He served as head football coach at Occidental College from 1967 to 1969, compiling a record of 8–17–1.  Gerhart was the offensive coordinator at Colorado State University from 1973 to 1974.  He worked as an assistant coach for several teams in the National Football League (NFL) between 1975 and 1979: the Cleveland Browns, San Francisco 49ers, Detroit Lions, and Chicago Bears.

Head coaching record

College

References

External links
 Pro Football Archives profile

1936 births
Living people
American football quarterbacks
Chicago Bears coaches
Cleveland Browns coaches
Colorado State Rams football coaches
Occidental Tigers football coaches
Occidental Tigers football players
Princeton Tigers football coaches
San Francisco 49ers coaches
Tulsa Golden Hurricane football coaches
High school football coaches in California
Sportspeople from Burbank, California
Players of American football from Los Angeles
Sports coaches from Los Angeles